San Ignacio Río Muerto Municipality is a municipality in Sonora in north-western Mexico.

Area and Population
The municipal area is 1,144.00 km2 with a population of 13,692 registered in 2000.  The population of the municipal seat was 6,937 in 2000. It is located at an elevation that varies between 0 and 50 meters.

Neighboring Municipalities
Neighboring municipalities are:
Guaymas—north
Bácum—north and east

Its western and southeastern boundaries are with the Gulf of California.

History
The municipality was created in 1996.

References

Municipalities of Sonora